Japanese submarine I-58 may refer to one of the following submarines of the Imperial Japanese Navy:

 , a Kaidai-type submarine; renamed I-158 in 1942; scuttled in 1946
 , a Type B submarine; sunk as a target in 1946

Japanese Navy ship names
Imperial Japanese Navy ship names